Sphegina dentata is a species of hoverfly in the family Syrphidae found in Taiwan.

Etymology
The name comes from Latin ‘dentata’, meaning ‘dentate’, referring to the dentate male cercus.

Description
In male specimens, the body length is 7.1–7.9 millimeters. The wings are 5.4–5.9 millimeters, entirely microtrichose and hyaline, with brownish stigma. The face is black, concave, strongly projected antero-ventrally, with a weakly developed frontal prominence and long pilose along the eye-margin. The gena and mouth edge are black, with a large subtriangular non-pollinose shiny area; frons and vertex black; a large trapezoidal area posterior of the lunula non-pollinose and shiny; occiput black, with light yellow pilose; antenna dark brown to black with black setae dorsally on scape and pedicel, basal flagellomere round; arista only basally short and pilose, slightly more than three times as long as the basal flagellomere. The thorax is black; scutellum black, semicircular, black, and shiny; pro- and mesoleg yellow on basal 1/10 of femora and basal ¼–⅓ of tibiae, tarsomeres 1–2 dark yellow; metafemur black with basal 1/5 yellow, slightly incrassate; metatibia black and yellow biannulate, without apicoventral dens; metatarsus entirely black, basal tarsomere rather thin; terga black. The surstyli and superior lobes are only slightly asymmetrical and the cerci are dentate and asymmetrical. No female specimens are known.

Related Species
S. dentata is similar to S. nigerrima, though it differs by having the lower epimeron with entirely grey pollinose (anterior half of the lower epimeron non-pollinose and shiny in S. nigerrima) as well as squarish and dentate cerci (cerci non-dentate in S. nigerrima). The male genitalia are similar to S. tricoloripes and S. umbrosa, though it differs from the latter by having a strongly sclerotized subapical tooth on the cercus and from the former by having only one cercal tooth instead of a row of 3–4 teeth. All three species resemble the East-Palaearctic species S. elongata, S. freyana, and S. grunini, but differ by having entirely grey pollinose pleura (instead of having the pleura extensively non-pollinose and shiny).

References

Eristalinae
Insects described in 2018
Diptera of Asia